Fewtrell is a surname. Notable people with the surname include: 

Albert Fewtrell (1885–1950), Australian railway engineer and army officer
Malcolm Fewtrell (1909–2005), British police officer
Max Fewtrell (born 1999), British racing driver
Percy Fewtrell (died 1970), Australian cleric